Pastor's Initiative is a dissident Roman Catholic group founded in Austria in 2006 by Helmut Schüller as its leader, initiated by an "Appeal to Disobedience", or "Call to Disobedience". Composed of priests with lay support, the group advocates ordination of women, married and non-celibate priesthood, allowing Holy Communion to remarried divorcees and non-Catholics.

Beliefs
Call to Disobedience favors ordination of women, married and non-celibate priesthood, allowing Holy Communion to remarried divorcees and non-Catholics and disagrees with some teachings of the Catholic Magisterium.  
Schüller believes the Holy Spirit is among the laity, that qualified lay people can preach and give communion  in parishes without a priest.  The group believes the way the Church is governed needs reform.  Schüller has stated:

Lecture tour
Schüller undertook a lecture tour in the United States in summer 2013. The tour included Boston; Philadelphia; Baltimore; Washington, D.C.; Chicago; Cleveland; Detroit; Cincinnati; Denver; San Diego; Los Angeles; Portland, Ore.; and Seattle. The tour was sponsored by Call to Action, Catholics in Alliance for the Common Good, CORPUS, DignityUSA, FutureChurch, National Coalition of American Nuns, New Ways Ministry, Voice of the Faithful, Quixote Center, and Women's Ordination Conference.
 

During the tour Schüller expressed concern because he feels the Church hierarchy ignores the views of the faithful.

Support
The movement claims the support of the majority of Austrian Catholic priests and enjoy further support elsewhere. 

The group claims growing membership in other countries as well.

Conflict
The group is not recognised by any official representatives of the Catholic Church. The group's teaching has been criticised for its deviation from Catholic doctrine.

Pope Benedict XVI criticised the movement several times in his weekly Wednesday audience, describing them as heretics and schismatics. By contrast, its founder, the Rev. Helmut Schüller, blames “absolutist monarchy” and resistance to change by the Vatican for a possible schism.

See also
Catholic Church in Austria
 Independent Catholic denominations

References

Catholic dissident organizations
LGBT and Catholicism
Ordination of women and the Catholic Church
Criticism of the Catholic Church